Six ships of the Royal Navy have borne the name HMS Simoom, after the desert wind, the Simoom:

 HMS Simoom was to have been a wooden paddle frigate, but she was renamed  in 1842, prior to being launched in 1845.
  was an iron screw frigate launched in 1849. She was converted to a troopship in 1852 and was sold in 1887.
 HMS Simoom was previously , an iron screw ship launched in 1868 and converted to a guardship in 1897, and a depot ship in 1904, when she was renamed HMS Simoom. She was sold in 1905.
  was an  launched in 1916 and sunk in 1917.
  was an  launched in 1918 and sold in 1931.
  was an S-class submarine launched in 1942 and sunk in unknown circumstances in 1943.

See also
Simoom (disambiguation)

Royal Navy ship names